Asura infumata is a moth of the family Erebidae. It is found in the north-western Himalayas.

References

infumata
Moths described in 1874
Moths of Asia